The Roman Catholic Archdiocese of Bukavu is the Metropolitan See for the Ecclesiastical province of Bukavu in the Democratic Republic of the Congo.

History
 1929.12.26: Established as Apostolic Vicariate of Kivu from the Apostolic Vicariate of Upper Congo
 1952.01.10: Renamed as Apostolic Vicariate of Costermansville
 1954.01.06: Renamed as Apostolic Vicariate of Bukavu
 1959.11.10: Promoted as Metropolitan Archdiocese of Bukavu

Special churches

The seat of the archbishop is Cathédrale Notre Dame de la Paix in Bukavu.

Bishops

Ordinaries, in reverse chronological order
 Metropolitan Archbishops of Bukavu (Latin Rite), below
 Archbishop François-Xavier Maroy since 2006.04.26
 Archbishop Charles Kambale Mbogha, A.A. (2001.03.13 – 2005.10.09)
 Archbishop Emmanuel Kataliko (1997.03.03 – 2000.10.04)
 Archbishop Christophe Munzihirwa Mwene Ngabo, S.J. (1995.03.14 – 1996.10.29)
 Archbishop Aloys Mulindwa Mutabesha Mugoma Mweru (1965.12.18 – 1993.09.15)
 Archbishop Louis van Steene, M. Afr. (1959.11.10 – 1965.05.24); see below
 Vicars Apostolic of Bukavu (Latin Rite), below
 Bishop Louis van Steene, M. Afr. (1957.03.08 – 1959.11.10); see above
 Bishop Xavier Geeraerts, M. Afr. (1952.01.17 – 1958)
 Vicars Apostolic of Kivu (Roman rite), below
 Bishop Richard Cleire, M. Afr. (1944.12.14 – 1952.01.10), appointed Vicar Apostolic of Kasongo
 Bishop Edoardo Luigi Antonio Leys, M. Afr. (1930.01.06 – 1944)
 Bishop Jean-Joseph Hirth, M. Afr. (1912.12.12 – 1920.10.25

Coadjutor vicar apostolic
Louis Van Steene, M. Afr. (1955-1957)

Auxiliary bishop
François-Xavier Maroy Rusengo (2004-2006)

Suffragan dioceses
 Butembo-Beni
 Goma
 Kasongo
 Kindu
 Uvira

See also
Roman Catholicism in the Democratic Republic of the Congo
List of Roman Catholic dioceses in the Democratic Republic of the Congo

Sources
 GCatholic.org

Bukavu
Roman Catholic dioceses in the Democratic Republic of the Congo
Christian organizations established in 1929
Roman Catholic dioceses and prelatures established in the 20th century
A